Cathy Hartman Mitchell is an author and television infomercial host for numerous "As seen on TV" products.

Television career
Mitchell is best known for hosting television infomercials for a wide range of products, such as the Chef-O-Matic Pro, the Sideshow Skillet, the Fry Pro 2, and the Turbo Cooker. She was among the first infomercial hosts to emerge after the FCC began to allow program-length advertisements in the 1980s. Her first infomercial was filmed in 1989 for a sandwich press known as the Snackmaster. Prior to her television career, she had worked performing product demonstrations at fairs in California, including the state fair.

In August 2008, Cathy appeared in an infomercial parody alongside John C. Reilly on the TV show Tim and Eric Awesome Show, Great Job! hosted on Adult Swim.

In 2014, Cathy Mitchell was featured on the Rachael Ray show. She participated in a Coffee Off with fellow pitchman Marc Gill which she lost by 8 cups.

Cookbooks
Mitchell is the author of a number of cookbooks. Her first was Dump Cakes, a small book of recipes for dump cakes – cobbler-like desserts which are easily prepared by "dumping" fruit and packaged cake mix into a pan without mixing. It was published in 2014 by TeleBrands. She has also written a number of other cookbooks whose titles play on the "dump" template, including Dump Dinners and Crock Pot Dump Meals, all of which were advertised on the Steve Harvey Show and on HSN. The titles of these books have been the source of some ridicule, given the negative or scatalogical connotations of the word dump. Mitchell has acknowledged this, and suggested it may have contributed to the success of the books. Dump Cakes was featured in a humorous "As Seen on TV gift guide" segment of the late-night talk show Jimmy Kimmel Live!.

Her later cookbooks include Ramen Joy and Ramen Nibbles, which are homemade dishes and desserts made with instant ramen noodles.

Personal life
Mitchell lives in Valley Springs, California. She has five children.

References

American television personalities
American women television personalities
Living people
Infomercials
Year of birth missing (living people)